Jujja Wieslander (née Bergkvist; born 12 June 1944 in Stockholm) is a Swedish author of children's books, best known for her fictional character of Mama Moo which was adapted into the animated feature film Mamma Moo and the Crow (2008). She was awarded an Astrid Lindgren Prize in 2005.

References 

1944 births
Living people
Swedish writers
Writers from Stockholm